The Taichung–Changhua metropolitan area is the second largest metropolitan area of Taiwan. Prior to 2010, It was officially defined as including the following areas:

Since the merger of Taichung City and the former Taichung County, the term is no longer in official  usage.

References 

Metropolitan areas of Taiwan
Geography of Taichung